Mount Misery Brook is a tributary of Greenwood Branch in the southern New Jersey Pine Barrens in the United States.

Mount Misery Brook starts in Brendan T. Byrne State Forest, flowing for approximately  before merging with Pole Bridge Branch to form Greenwood Branch.

See also
Pinelands Center at Mount Misery, a campground and retreat center near the brook
List of rivers of New Jersey

References

External links
Brendan T. Byrne State Forest

Rivers in the Pine Barrens (New Jersey)
Rivers of New Jersey
Tributaries of Rancocas Creek
Rivers of Burlington County, New Jersey